The Conic Sections Rebellion, also known as the Conic Section Rebellion, refers primarily to an incident which occurred at Yale University in 1830, as a result of changes in the methods of mathematics education. When a policy change dictated that students were required to draw reference diagrams for exams rather than be allowed to refer to diagrams in their textbooks, a number of students staged a rebellion in which they refused to take the exams at all. A precursor incident occurred in 1825; historian Clarence Deming described the 1830 incident as being "much more serious", and stated that the two incidents should be "sharply demarcated".

1825 incident
In 1825, students of the Yale sophomore class claimed that "by explicit contract with (their) mathematical tutor, (they were) exempt from the corollaries of the text-book (on conic sections)", and refused to recite these corollaries. Thirty-eight students out of a class of eighty-seven, including Horace Bushnell, William H. Welch, Henry Hogeboom, and William Adams, were suspended; faculty contacted the students' parents, and the students were pressured into signing a statement of concession:

1830 incident
Prior to the introduction of blackboards, Yale students had been allowed to consult diagrams in their textbooks when solving geometry problems pertaining to conic sections – even on exams. When the students were no longer allowed to consult the text, but were instead required to draw their own diagrams on the blackboard, they refused to take the final exam. As a result, forty-three of the ninety-six students – among them, Alfred Stillé, and Andrew Calhoun, the son of John C. Calhoun – were summarily expelled, and Yale authorities warned neighboring universities against admitting them.

References

Yale University
History of education in the United States
1825 in Connecticut
1830 in Connecticut